The Purple Mountain Observatory, also known as Zijinshan Astronomical Observatory is an astronomical observatory located on the Purple Mountain in the east of Nanjing.

Description 

The Purple Mountain Observatory was established in 1934 funded by the Nationalist Government of the Republic of China and administered by Academia Sinica. The longtime director of the observatory from 1950 to 1984 was Chinese astronomer Zhang Yuzhe (1902–1986, also known as Y. C. Chang).

By the late 1980s, increasing light pollution in Nanjing meant Purple Mountain was no longer viable as a working observatory. It has since shifted its focus to public education, with much of the actual scientific work being carried out in its five branch observatories located at Qinghai (in Delingha), Ganyu, Xuyi, Honghe (in Jiamusi), and Qingdao.

The Minor Planet Center credits the observatory, simply referred to as Nanking, with the discovery of 149 minor planets between 1955 and 1983, while the observatory's PMO NEO Survey Program is credited with more than 600 discoveries between 2006 and 2013.

Discoveries 

The observatory discovered the periodic comets 60P/Tsuchinshan and 62P/Tsuchinshan, as well as the non-periodic  (Tsuchinshan), also known as Comet 1977 X, and C/2023 A3 (Tsuchinshan-ATLAS). Many asteroids were also discovered, including the Trojan asteroids 2223 Sarpedon, 2260 Neoptolemus, 2363 Cebriones, 2456 Palamedes, and the eponymous 3494 Purple Mountain.

Near-Earth object survey 

The Chinese Near-Earth Object Survey (CNEOS), based at the Xuyi Station  in Xuyi, Jiangsu, started observations in 2006. It uses a 1:04=1:20=1:80 m Schmidt telescope equipped with a 4K × 4K CCD detector with the drift-scanning function. As of August 2012, the program has observed 149,971 asteroids, found 1,279 new provisional designation asteroids, and cataloged 251 numbered asteroids including five Jupiter trojans, two Hildian, and one Phocaea asteroid.

List of discovered minor planets (1955–1983) 

A total of 149 minor planets were discovered by the Purple Mountain Observatory between 1955 and 1983.

List of discoveries by the PMO NEO Survey Program 

Several hundred minor planets were discovered by the observatory's PMO NEO Survey Program from 2006 to 2013.

Image gallery

See also 
 List of astronomical observatories
 Liu Caipin
 Wang Sichao

References

External links 

 Purple Mountain Observatory website 

 
Astronomical observatories in China
Buildings and structures in Nanjing

Minor-planet discovering observatories
Major National Historical and Cultural Sites in Jiangsu
Research institutes of the Chinese Academy of Sciences